Marand and Jolfa (electoral district) is the 3rd electoral district in the East Azerbaijan Province of Iran. This electoral district has a population of 294,375 and elects 1 member of parliament.

1980
MP in 1980 from the electorate of Marand and Jolfa. (1st)
 Esmaeil Rafieian

1984
MP in 1984 from the electorate of Marand and Jolfa. (2nd)
 Reza Karimi

1988
MP in 1988 from the electorate of Marand and Jolfa. (3rd)
 Karim Shafeei

1992
MP in 1992 from the electorate of Marand and Jolfa. (4th)
 Ebrahim Sarraf

1996
MP in 1996 from the electorate of Marand and Jolfa. (5th)
 Hassan Hoseinzadeh

2000
MP in 2000 from the electorate of Marand and Jolfa. (6th)
 Bagher Emami

2004
MP in 2004 from the electorate of Marand and Jolfa. (7th)
 Karim Shafeei

2008
MP in 2008 from the electorate of Marand and Jolfa. (8th)
 Siros Sazdar

2012
MP in 2012 from the electorate of Marand and Jolfa. (9th)
 Mohammad Hassannejad

2016

Notes

References

Electoral districts of East Azerbaijan
Jolfa County
Marand County